Xiyuzhuang Subdistrict is a subdistrict located in the center of Hongqiao District, Tianjin, China. It shares border with Xianyang North Road and Dingzigu Subdistricts in the north, Xigu Subdistrict in the east and south, and Tianmu Town in the west. It had 80,888 people residing under its administration as of 2010.

The subdistrict was named after Xiyuzhuang Village that preceded the residential communities here.

Geography 
Xiyuzhuang subdistrict is located on the north of Ziya River.

History

Administrative divisions 
As of the year 2021, Xiyuzhuang Subdistrict oversaw 16 residential communities. They are listed as follows:

Gallery

See also 

 List of township-level divisions of Tianjin

References 

Township-level divisions of Tianjin
Hongqiao District, Tianjin